The City of Bradford Metropolitan District Council election took place on Thursday 1 May 2008.

Ward results
An asterisk denotes an incumbent

Baildon ward

Bingley ward
Cllr. Colin Gill resigned in September 2008 due to strain the position had placed on his professional life. John Pennington was elected in a by-election in December 2008, retaining the seat for the Conservative Party.

Bingley Rural ward

Bolton & Undercliffe ward

Bowling & Barkerend ward
Incumbent Rupert Oliver switched from the Lib Dems to Labour in October 2006.

Bradford Moor ward

City ward

Clayton & Fairweather Green ward

Craven ward

Eccleshill ward

Great Horton ward
Cllr. Paul Flowers (Labour Party) stood down in 2011 after "adult content" was found on a council computer he had used. Abdul Jabar retained the seat for the party in a by-election later the same year.

Heaton ward

Idle & Thackley ward

Ilkley ward

Keighley Central ward

Keighley East ward

Keighley West ward
Robert Payne was subsequently found guilty of tax fraud and jailed in December 2013.

Little Horton ward

Manningham ward

Queensbury ward

Royds ward

Shipley ward

Thornton & Allerton ward

Toller ward
Councillor Arshad Hussain resigned from the Conservative group in February 2010 to become a Labour councillor.

Tong ward

Wharfedale ward

Wibsey ward

Windhill & Wrose ward

Worth Valley ward

Wyke ward

By-elections between 2008 and 2010 elections
Vote changes correspond to the 2008 Council election.

Bingley ward
This was triggered by the resignation of Cllr. Colin Gill (Conservative Party).

References

2008
Bradford
2000s in West Yorkshire